Steinar Maribo (born 22 January 1942 in Åsnes) is a Norwegian politician for the Progress Party.

He was elected to the Norwegian Parliament from Buskerud in 1989, but was not re-elected in 1993.

Maribo held various positions in Røyken municipality council from 1983 to 1997, serving as deputy mayor in 1987–1989.

References

1942 births
Living people
People from Åsnes
People from Røyken
Progress Party (Norway) politicians
Members of the Storting
20th-century Norwegian politicians
Buskerud politicians